The Clarence is a river in northern France whose  course crosses the department of Pas-de-Calais.

Its source is near the village of Sains-lès-Pernes. It flows through the communes of Sachin, Pernes, Calonne-Ricouart, Calonne-sur-la-Lys and Gonnehem, finally joining the Lys near Merville.

It has two tributaries, the Nave and the Grand Nocq.

References

External links
(All French language)
Banque Hydro - Station E3646210 - La Clarence à Robecq Bassin versant = 
 Informations générales sur les atlas des zones inondables

Rivers of France
Rivers of the Pas-de-Calais
Rivers of Hauts-de-France